TESOL may refer to:

 Teaching English as a second or foreign language
 TESOL International Association, a professional organization for teachers of English as a second or foreign language.
 TESOL Quarterly
 TESOL Journal